Hayato may refer to: 

Hayato (given name), a masculine Japanese given name
Hayato, Kagoshima, a town located in Aira District, Kagoshima, Japan
, people of ancient Japan
Hayato (satellite), a Japanese CubeSat